Nowruzi may refer to:
 Nowruzi, Khoshab, Razavi Khorasan Province
 Nowruzi, Quchan, Razavi Khorasan Province
 Nowruzi Mosaic Blocks, Khuzestan Province